is a Japanese actress, model, television host, and former member of Japanese idol girl group Nogizaka46. Her lead roles in TV and film have included Asahi Tōjima in Asahinagu and Ai Amano in Denei Shojo: Video Girl Ai 2018. She co-hosts the Fuji TV variety show Lion no Goo Touch.

Career 
In 2011 Nishino auditioned for Nogizaka46 and was selected as one of the 36 first generation members. She was chosen as one of the members performing on their debut single "Guruguru Curtain", released on February 22, 2012. On November 8, 2012, Nishino made her model debut walking the runway at GirlsAward 2012 Autumn/Winter with Nogizaka46 bandmate Mai Shiraishi.

She was selected as the choreographic center for the first time for Nogizaka46's 8th single "Kizuitara Kataomoi", which was released on April 2, 2014. Her first solo song, "Hitoriyogari" was included on Nogizaka46's debut album Tōmei na Iro, which was released on January 7, 2015. Nishino's first photo book, titled Fudangi (Everyday Clothes), was published on February 18, 2015. It sold 36,000 copies in a week and ranked 1st on the Oricon weekly sales chart in the photobook category. She was the second member from Nogizaka46 to release a photo book, after Shiraishi.

Nishino returned to the center position for the group's 11th single, "Inochi wa Utsukushii", which was released on March 18, 2015. The single also included her second solo song, titled "Gomenne Zutto..." as a B-side. She appeared in the fashion magazine non-no as an exclusive model starting with the June 2015 issue. In July 2015 she played the lead role in the Nogizaka46 TV softball drama Hatsumori Bemars. On August 30, 2015, Nishino and Shiraishi were selected as Nogizaka46's first double center for their thirteenth single "Ima, Hanashitai Dareka ga Iru".

On March 7, 2016, Nishino was announced as the co-host of the Fuji TV variety show Lion no Goo Touch. Her 2nd photo book, Kaze o Kigaete, was published on September 29, 2016. The included photos were taken in Malta and Italy over 5 days. Kaze o Kigaete ranked first on the Oricon book ranking in the photobook category for two consecutive weeks. On 22 September 2017, the film adaptation of the naginata manga Asahinagu was released, with Nishino playing the starring role of Asahi Tōjima.

On September 20, 2018, Nishino announced her graduation from Nogizaka46 on the group's official blog. Her first post-Nogizaka46 acting role was as Yōko Matsuda in the 2019 TV Tokyo series Bet on This Girl! A supporting role in the NTV series It's Your Turn followed later that year.

Discography

Singles with Nogizaka46

Albums with Nogizaka46

Other featured songs

Filmography

Television

Webseries

Films

Commercials

Bibliography

Magazines
 Up to Boy +, Wani Books 1979-, since October 2014
 Non-no, Shueisha 1971-, as an exclusive model since the June 2015 issue

Photobooks
 Kikan Nogizaka vol.1 Sōshun (5 March 2014, Tokyo News Service) 
 Fudangi (18 February 2015, Gentosha) 
 Kaze o Kigaete (27 September 2016, Shūeisha) 
 Watashi no Koto (9 May 2018, Shueisha)

Awards

References

External links 
  on Nogizaka46 LLC.
 
  on Nogizaka46 LLC.
  on Nogizaka46 LLC.
 

Nogizaka46 members
1994 births
Living people
Japanese idols
Japanese women singers
J-pop singers
Japanese television actresses
Japanese film actresses
Japanese female models
Japanese television personalities
Japanese gravure models
People from Osaka Prefecture
Musicians from Osaka Prefecture